Thalictrum delavayi, Chinese meadow-rue, is a species of flowering plant in the family Ranunculaceae native to China.

The specific epithet delavayi honours the 19th century French explorer and botanist Père Jean Marie Delavay.

The cultivar 'Ankum' has gained the Royal Horticultural Society's Award of Garden Merit.

References

delavayi
Plants described in 1886
Taxa named by Adrien René Franchet